Just This Once is a 1952 American romantic comedy film directed by Don Weis and starring Peter Lawford, Janet Leigh and Lewis Stone. It was produced and distributed by the Hollywood major Metro-Goldwyn-Mayer. The film's sets were designed by the art director James Basevi.

Plot
Mark MacLene IV is a millionaire playboy. He is totally irresponsible with his money, piling up $5 million in debts. Judge Coulter, executor of his estate, puts Mark's finances in the hands of a penny-pinching lawyer, Lucy Duncan.

Mark is aghast when Lucy puts him on a $50-a-week allowance. He still extravagantly tips a busboy $10 after a 50-cent lunch or charters a plane to fly off to Paris without a thought as to his financial situation. Lucy shuts off his access to funds, causing an angry Mark to barge into her personal life, moving into her apartment and upsetting her routine. She wants to quit, but Coulter doubles her pay.

Lucy has a fiancé, Tom Winters, who has held off on proposing marriage until he can afford it. Mark owns a construction company where Tom works, so secretly he plots to get Tom a huge raise. Lucy sees through the ruse. But when she learns Mark also has offered his yacht for their honeymoon, she begins to see a different side to him.

Now in love, Mark and Lucy must hold off making plans for the future because the Naval Reserve has called him to active duty. Lucy fears for his safety, but Mark says he's going to Washington, D.C. and getting a desk job where he will be in charge of Navy expenditures.

Cast
 Peter Lawford as Mark MacLene
 Janet Leigh as Lucille Duncan
 Lewis Stone as Judge Coulter
 Richard Anderson as Tom Winters
 Marilyn Erskine as Gertrude Crome
 Douglas Fowley as Frank Pirosh
 Hanley Stafford as Mr. Blackwell
 Henry Slate as Jeff Parma
 Jerry Hausner as Stanley Worth
 Benny Rubin as Herbert Engel
 Charles Watts as Adam Backwith

Reception
According to MGM records the film earned $707,000 in the US and Canada and $352,000 elsewhere, making a profit of $89,000.

Comic book adaptation
 Eastern Color Movie Love #14 (April 1952)

References

External links
 
 Just This Once at TCMDB
 
 

1952 films
Metro-Goldwyn-Mayer films
1952 romantic comedy films
American romantic comedy films
Films adapted into comics
Films scored by David Rose
Films directed by Don Weis
1950s English-language films
1950s American films
Films set in New York City
Films set in Hawaii